This article is the discography of English R&B and jazz musician Georgie Fame, both with the Blue Flames and as a solo artist.

Albums

Studio albums

Live albums

Compilation albums

EPs

Singles

Notes

References 

Discographies of British artists
Rhythm and blues discographies
Jazz discographies